Ricardo Delgado may refer to:

 Ricardo Delgado (comics), film and comic book artist
 Ricardo Delgado (boxer) (born 1947), boxer from Mexico
 Ricardo Delgado (Colombian footballer) (born 1994), Colombian football attacking midfielder
 Ricardo Delgado (Luxembourgian footballer) (born 1994), Luxembourgian football centre-back